= Frog Juice =

Card game

Frog Juice is a card game that was published by Gamewright in 1995.

== Gameplay ==
Frog Juice is a card game in which players capture cards to obtain enough ingredients to make a potion.

== Reviews ==
In the January 1996 edition of Dragon (Issue #225), Rick Swan called this "a charming little card game, easy enough for kids, yet engaging enough for undemanding grown-ups."
